James Robert Leavelle (August 23, 1920 – August 29, 2019) was a Dallas Police Department homicide detective who, on November 24, 1963, was escorting John F. Kennedy assassin Lee Harvey Oswald through the basement of Dallas Police headquarters when Oswald was shot by Jack Ruby. Leavelle prominently appeared in several famous photographs—including one that won a Pulitzer Prize—taken of Oswald just before and as Ruby pulled the trigger.

Early life and military service
Leavelle was born and raised in Red River County, Texas. In 1937, Leavelle joined the Civilian Conservation Corps. In April 1942, the Whitney left Pearl Harbor and headed for the South Pacific Ocean to support operations there. After being knocked down and seriously injured by a rogue wave, he was evacuated to Oak Knoll Naval Hospital near Oakland, California. In the hospital, he met nurse Taimi Snelma, his wife-to-be. Around the same time, Leavelle left on a medical discharge to take a civilian supply job with the Army Air Force in Southern California.

Police career
After World War II ended, Leavelle worked as an auditor for the Veterans Administration until 1950. Leavelle began a career as a homicide detective in the Dallas Police Department in April 1950 and retired in April 1975.

Kennedy assassination
On November 24, 1963, two days after the assassination of United States President John F. Kennedy, Lee Harvey Oswald was handcuffed between Leavelle and fellow detective L. C. Graves as he was being led through the basement of the Dallas Police Headquarters to an armored car for the short trip from the city jail to the county jail. Jack Ruby then stepped from the crowd and fatally shot Oswald at point-blank range.

On March 25, 1964, Leavelle provided testimony to Warren Commission assistant counsel Leon Hubert. He provided additional testimony to assistant counsel Joseph Ball on April 7.

When Leavelle testified before the Warren Commission, he said that the first time he had ever sat in on an interrogation with Oswald was on Sunday morning, November 24, 1963. When Counsel Joseph Ball asked Leavelle if he had ever spoken to Oswald before this interrogation, he stated, "No, I had never talked to him before". Leavelle then stated during his testimony that "the only time I had connections with Oswald was this Sunday morning [November 24, 1963]. I never had [the] occasion... to talk with him at any time..."

The tan suit that Leavelle wore on November 24, 1963, is on display at the Sixth Floor Museum.

Leavelle supported the official conclusion that Oswald acted alone and also refuted conspiracy theories surrounding the assassination.

Portrayals
Fifteen years after the assassination, Leavelle appeared as himself in the 1978 made-for-television movie, Ruby and Oswald.

The character Leavelle, who trains Homer Simpson at "Leavelle's Bodyguard Academy" in The Simpsons''' episode "Mayored to the Mob", is based on Jim Leavelle as he appeared when Oswald was shot by Ruby. Leavelle was voiced by Mark Hamill. Leavelle trains the bodyguards by pretending to shoot their protectee from a grassy knoll on a cart. This is a reference to the grassy knoll at the site of President John F. Kennedy's assassination, Dealey Plaza, and a scene from the Kennedy assassination film Executive Action (1973).

"The Guy in the White Hat" Griffin, who appears in the Family Guy episode "Peter-assment", is based on Leavelle.

Later life and death
In December 1992, while demonstrating how L. C. Graves grabbed Ruby's gun in an attempt to stop him from firing, Leavelle accidentally shot researcher and photographer Bob Porter in the arm, using the same model gun Ruby had used. Porter recovered at Parkland Hospital, the same facility where Kennedy, Oswald, Ruby, and Abraham Zapruder either died or were pronounced dead.

In a 2006 interview, Leavelle said that he was the first to interrogate Oswald after his arrest; he said that he joked with Oswald before the transfer, saying "Lee, if anybody shoots at you, I hope they're as good a shot as you are," meaning that the person would hit Oswald instead of Leavelle. Oswald smiled and said, "You're being melodramatic. Nobody's going to shoot at me." Leavelle recreated this moment during his appearance in the 1978 TV movie, Ruby and Oswald''. In fact, his only line of dialogue in the film is his joke to Oswald.

In an interview with author Joseph McBride, Leavelle said he had different views on the murder of President Kennedy and Dallas police officer J. D. Tippit, describing the president's assassination as "no different than a south Dallas nigger killing...it was just another murder inside the city limits of Dallas. I've handled hundreds of them." Leavelle told McBride about Tippit, "What some people don't realize is that when a police officer gets killed, that takes precedence over the shooting of the president, because that's close to home."

Robert McClelland, who treated Oswald at Parkland Hospital, has said that while at Parkland, he noticed that Leavelle was waiting outside the hospital room and said that Leavelle told him that after Oswald was shot, he claimed to have "leaned over Oswald and said, 'Son, you're hurt real bad. Do you wanna say anything?' He looked at me for a second. He waited like he was thinking. Then he shook his head back and forth just as wide as he could. Then he closed his eyes."

In November 2011, Leavelle lost an eye after a serious fall, after which he wore a glass eye.

In 2013, the Dallas Police Department's Detective of the Year Award was named in Leavelle's honor.

After Leavelle's wife Taimi died in 2014, he lived in Garland, Texas. Leavelle died from a heart attack following hip surgery on August 29, 2019, at the age of 99.

References

Further reading

External links

Living History with James "Jim" Leavelle (2008) via YouTube

1920 births
2019 deaths
United States Navy personnel of World War II
American police detectives
Attack on Pearl Harbor
Civilian Conservation Corps people
Dallas Police Department officers
People associated with the assassination of John F. Kennedy
Military personnel from Dallas
People from Red River County, Texas
United States Navy sailors